European Nations Cup may refer to:

UEFA European Championship, formerly known as European Nations' Cup
Europcar Cup, a European Tour golf tournament
European Nations Cup (golf), a European Ladies Tour golf tournament
European Nations Cup (field hockey)
Rugby League European Championship, formerly known as the European Championship and European Nations Cup
European Nations Cup (rugby union)

See also 
 ENC (disambiguation)
 European Cup (disambiguation)